Demirbilek can refer to:

 Demirbilek, Batman
 Demirbilek, İspir